Jørn Stubberud (born 13 April 1968) is a Norwegian musician best known as the bassist in the black metal band Mayhem under the stage name Necrobutcher. He is one of Mayhem's founding members, along with Euronymous and Manheim. He is the band's only remaining original member, as Messiah and Manheim left Mayhem, respectively, in 1986 and 1988, and Euronymous was murdered in 1993. He has also played in other bands, including L.E.G.O., Kvikksølvguttene, Bloodthorn (guest artist), and Checker Patrol.

Mayhem 
Necrobutcher was in the band since 1984, but left in 1991 because of personal concerns following the suicide of former vocalist Dead as well as internal conflicts and disagreement with bandmate Euronymous. He was replaced as a session bassist by Varg Vikernes, who murdered Euronymous in 1993. In 1995, Necrobutcher reformed the band, along with Hellhammer, Maniac and Blasphemer. He still plays in Mayhem.

In 2018, he released his retrospective book about the early stages of the band, The Death Archives: Mayhem 1984–94, published by Thurston Moore's publishing house Ecstatic Peace Library.

Personal life

Necrobutcher is an atheist. He has a daughter and a grandson.

Discography

Albums  
 De Mysteriis Dom Sathanas (1994) (Songwriting)
 Grand Declaration of War (2000)
 Chimera (2004)
 Ordo ad Chao (2007)
 Esoteric Warfare (2014)
 Daemon (2019)

EPs 
 Deathcrush (1987)
 Wolf's Lair Abyss (1997)
 Life Eternal (2008)  (Lyrics)
 Atavistic Black Disorder / Kommando (2021)

Live albums 
Live in Leipzig (1993)
The Dawn of the Black Hearts (1995)
Mediolanum Capta Est (1999)
Live in Marseille (2001)
Live in Zeitz (2016)
De Mysteriis Dom Sathanas Alive (2016)
Live in Jessheim (2017)
Live in Sarpsborg (2019)

References

Further reading

External links

1968 births
Living people
Norwegian heavy metal bass guitarists
Norwegian male bass guitarists
Mayhem (band) members
Norwegian black metal musicians
Norwegian rock bass guitarists
Place of birth missing (living people)